Gary Pearson may refer to:

Gary Pearson (comedian), Canadian comedian
Gary Pearson (footballer) (1976–2022), English footballer